Bleachers are raised, tiered rows of benches.

Bleachers may also refer to:
 Bleachers (band), an American indie pop band started by Jack Antonoff
 Bleachers (novel), a novel by John Grisham
 Bleach wash jeans, worn as part of early 1980s skinhead and punk fashion